Jesse S. Cave (1872–1948) was briefly acting mayor of New Orleans from July 15 to August 17, 1936.

Cave arrived in New Orleans in 1904 as a manager of an iron cistern company, and was elected president of the New Orleans Board of Trade in 1930.  In 1932 he was elected Louisiana State Treasurer. Along with A. Miles Pratt and Fred A. Earhart, Cave was one of three acting mayors who served in the summer of 1936 between the resignation of Mayor T. Semmes Walmsley and the accession of Robert Maestri. After his brief tenure as acting mayor, Cave was elected Commissioner of  Public Finance under the commission council government of the Maestri administration where he served from 1936 to 1946.

References

Sources 
 Choctaw Club of New Orleans.  Truth Achievements of the Mayor Robert S. Maestri Administration.  Franklin Printing Co., 1943.

1872 births
1948 deaths
Mayors of New Orleans
Louisiana Democrats
People from Van Alstyne, Texas